Hordalands doedskvad (English: Death poems of Hordaland), appears on the album cover as ...Doedskvad, is the third full-length album from Norwegian black metal band Taake. It was released on 28 February 2005.

Track listing
All lyrics and music by Hoest.

Personnel

Taake
Doedsjarl Hoest – vocals, guitars
C. Corax – guitars 
Mord – drums 
Radek Nemec – bass, vocals (on tracks 2, 7), guitars (on tracks 1, 7)

Additional personnel
Utflod – piano 
Steigen – vocals (falsetto) (track 7) 
Stoever – whispering voice (track 2) 
J. Nordavind – vocals (track 1) 
Helveteskommandant Nattefrost – vocals (track 1) 
Taipan – vocals (tracks 3, 7) 
Discomforter – vocals (track 2)
Steigen – producer 
Pytten – producer

Taake albums
2005 albums
Dark Essence Records albums